"Every Race Has a Flag but the Coon" was a  song written by Will A. Heelan, and J. Fred Helf that was popular in the United States and the United Kingdom. The song followed the previous success of "All Coons Look Alike to Me", written in 1896 by Ernest Hogan. H. L. Mencken cites it as being one of the three coon songs that "firmly established the term coon in the American vocabulary".

The song was a musical hit for A. M. Rothschild and Company in 1901.  New York's Siegel Cooper Company referred to it as one of their greatest hits the following April. The next month it was sung during "Music on the Piers" in New York, becoming the first song played at the Metropolitan Avenue pier. In his book The Movies That Changed Us: Reflections on the Screen, Nick Clooney refers to the song as part of the "hit parade" of popular music one could use to measure the temper of the times when The Birth of a Nation premiered in 1915. It was also Marie Dressler's contribution to the 'coon' genre. Lottie Gilson, Williams and Walker, Frances Curran, Hodges and Launchmere, Libby and Bennett, Zoa Matthews, Johnnie Carroll, Clarice Vance, Gerie Gilson, Joe Bonnell, The Eldridges and "100 other artists" sang the song with "overwhelming success", according to its sheet music.

The song motivated the creation of the Pan-African flag in 1920 by the members of the Universal Negro Improvement Association and African Communities League. In a 1927 report of a 1921 speech appearing in the Negro World weekly newspaper, Marcus Garvey was quoted as saying,

The lyrics to "Every Race Has a Flag but the Coon" include the musical meme "four eleven forty four".

References

External links
 Lyrics to "Every Race has a Flag but the Coon" and "All Coons Look Alike to Me"

Race-related controversies in music
Anti-black racism in the United States
1901 songs
African and Black nationalism
Pan-Africanism
American songs
African-American cultural history
Stereotypes of African Americans
Songs about black people
American music history
Anti-African and anti-black slurs
Flag controversies in the United States
Ethnic humour
Universal Negro Improvement Association and African Communities League